The women's balance beam competition at the 2016 Summer Olympics was held at the HSBC Arena on 15 August.

Competition format
The top 8 qualifiers in the qualification phase (limit two per NOC), based on combined score of each apparatus, advanced to the individual all-around final. The finalists performed on each apparatus again. Qualification scores were then ignored, with only final round scores counting.

Qualification

The gymnasts who ranked top eight qualified for final round. In cases where there were more than two gymnasts in the same NOC, the last ranked among them would not qualify to the final round. The next best ranked gymnast would qualify instead.

Only two gymnasts from each country may advance to the balance beam final. Therefore, in some cases, a third and/or fourth placed high enough to qualify, but did not advance to the final because of the quota. Gymnasts who did not advance to the final, but had high enough scores to do so were:

  (T-7th place)
  (T-7th place)

Final

 Laurie Hernandez and Marine Boyer appealed against their scores, but both inquiries were rejected.

Gallery

References

Women's balance beam
2016
2016 in women's gymnastics
Women's events at the 2016 Summer Olympics